Apyrrothrix is a genus of skippers in the family Hesperiidae.

Species
Funet recognizes two species in the genus Apyrrothrix. While Butterflies of America recognizes Apyrrothrix as a monotypic genus with A. araxes as its sole member and with A. arizonae recognized as subspecies arizonae.
Apyrrothrix araxes (Hewitson, 1867)
Apyrrothrix arizonae (Godman & Salvin, 1893) (Sometimes as Apyrrothrix araxes arizonae)

References

Hesperiidae
Hesperiidae genera